Nick Twinamatsiko is a Ugandan writer and civil engineer. He is the author of novels Chwezi Code, Jesse's Jewel; a Parable of the Lost Love, and Mug: the Chwezi guru, and a collection of poems, Till the Promised Land & Other Poems.

Early life and education
He attended Mbarara municipal primary school, and subsequently went to Ntare school for his secondary level education. He joined Makerere University, where he graduated with a degree in civil engineering.

Published works

Novels

Poetry collections

References

External links 
"Caine Prize workshop underlines Uganda’s rise in literature"
"Interview with Brian Bwesigye, Ugandan Writer"
 Brian Bwesigye, "Uganda’s education system should develop talent", Daily Monitor, 4 September 2010.

Living people
21st-century Ugandan poets
Ugandan writers
Ugandan novelists
Male novelists
Makerere University alumni
Ugandan male poets
Year of birth missing (living people)
21st-century male writers